Brachygobius is a small genus of gobies. They are popular aquarium fish where a number of species are sold as bumblebee gobies because their colours are similar to those of bumblebees.

Morphology
Bumblebee gobies range in size from 1.5 cm to 4 cm. They are generally coloured black with pale yellow to orange bands. Males are generally slimmer than females and often have more vivid colours, typically orange rather than yellow. Females may also have smaller and rounder heads. When spawning, the colours of the males become deeper, the orange bands becoming red in the case of Brachygobius doriae.

Taxonomy
This genus is informally divided by taxonomists into the dwarf Brachygobius nunus-species group (e.g., B. nunus, B. aggregatus, and B. mekongensis) and the bigger Brachygobius doriae-species group (e.g., B. doriae, B. sabanus, and B. xanthomelas).

Species
There are currently nine recognized species in this genus:
 Brachygobius aggregatus Herre, 1940 (Schooling bumblebee goby)
 Brachygobius doriae (Günther, 1868) (Bumblebee goby)
 Brachygobius kabiliensis Inger, 1958 (Kabili bumblebee goby)
 Brachygobius mekongensis Larson & Vidthayanon, 2000
 Brachygobius nunus (F. Hamilton, 1822)
 Brachygobius sabanus Inger, 1958
 Brachygobius sua (H. M. Smith, 1931)
 Brachygobius xanthomelas Herre, 1937
 Brachygobius xanthozonus (Bleeker, 1849) (Bumblebee fish)

Ecology
Bumblebee gobies are found across Southern and Southeast Asia primarily in freshwater habitats but also in slightly brackish waters.

Reproduction
These gobies are oviparous. Eggs are deposited in a cave where they are guarded by the male. Clutch size is around 150-200 eggs. The eggs hatch after around seven days and the fry become free swimming another five to seven days later.

In the aquarium
Bumblebee gobies are popular aquarium fish. A tank around 40 liters in size will house a dozen specimens comfortably. Under good conditions they can live in an aquarium for around 5 years. The most commonly traded species in the hobby belong to the Brachygobius doriae-species group but the smaller Brachygobius nunus is also traded occasionally. Although many aquarium books use the name Brachygobius xanthozona, this species is very rare in the wild and is not commercially traded.

References

 
Gobionellinae
Taxa named by Pieter Bleeker
Freshwater fish genera